Glossoscolex is a genus of South American earthworm.

References 

Haplotaxida